The 2015–16 Biathlon World Cup – World Cup 9 was held in Khanty-Mansiysk, Russia, from 17 March until 20 March 2016. Due to strong winds on the final day of competition, which caused a light pole to collapse onto the shooting range, the men's and women's mass start events were cancelled.

Schedule of events

Medal winners

Men

Women

Achievements 

 Best performance for all time

 , 1st place in Sprint
 , 3rd place in Sprint
 , 4th place in Sprint
 , 12th place in Sprint

References 

2015–16 Biathlon World Cup
Biathlon World Cup
March 2016 sports events in Russia
Sport in Khanty-Mansiysk
Biathlon competitions in Russia